Nha Fala, English title: My Voice is a 2002 internationally co-produced musical film directed by Bissau Guinean director Flora Gomes. The movie stars Fatou N'Diaye (sometimes as Ndiaye), Ángelo Torres, Jean-Christophe Dollé and Bia Gomes.

Plot
It has always been a firm conviction of the family that any woman who sings, will die. Now, while a girl is in France she becomes an international star. She realises that sooner rather than later her mother in Africa will learn that she sings. To solve this dilemma she goes back to her native village and arranges her own funeral, albeit with instantaneous rebirth. She is lying in the coffin while all invited guest form a queue and pass the coffin one by one. When she needs go to the toilet a boy will take her place. And then one of the guests says: How different she looks after having died. Is this an allusion to Bergman's movie "Now About These Women"?

Cast
 Fatou N'Diaye - Vita
 Ângelo Torres - Yano
 Jean-Christophe Dollé - Pierre
 Bia Gomes - Vita's mother
Jorge Biague -Mito
José Carlos Imbombo -Caminho
François Hadji-Lazaro - Bjorn
Danièle Évenou - Pierre's mother
Bonnafet Tarbouriech - Pierre's father

Production
The film was shot in Mindelo, one of the country's two cultural city and in Paris, the music were written and produced by Manu Dibango.  It was produced by Fado Filmes, a Portuguese company, alongside les Films de Mai based in France and Samsa Film based in Luxembourg. Fatou N'Diaye, born in Senegal in 1980 learned the Cape Verdean Creole.

Reception
This musical comedy, which accompanies dancing like and its influences, the cheerful and dramatic narrative with African family traditions, with the emancipation of women and the exclusion of foreigners in Europe. The title Nha Fala (Portuguese: A minha fala, feminine of A minha voz which means "my voice") also stands for the desire to express his innermost heart, unadulterated and free.

The movie was seen in several movie festivals including the 2002 Venice Film Festival where it was awarded, the African Film Festival of Ouagadougou in Burkina Faso, the Amiens Film Festival in the north of France., the 3 Continents Festival in Nantes, France, the 2002 Carthage Film Festival in Tunisia and the 2003 28th Annual Göteborg (Gothenburg) Film Festival in Sweden. In Brazil, they were seen at the 31st Bahía International Film Festival held in 2004 and the 2007 Itu Film Festival. In 2008, it was seen at the 2008 Göteborg (Gothenburg) Film Festival.

Release
The film was released on 25 May 2003 in Portugal, later it was released in France on 16 June 2003, Guinea-Bissau on 6 March 2004 and later in Cape Verde.

My Voice was later released on DVD in 2013.

See also
Cinema of Cape Verde
List of Portuguese films of the 2000s
List of French films of 2002
List of Luxembourgian films

References

Further reading
Nha Fala in Lisbon

Magazine issues
 Revista Cinélive no. 70, p. 62
 Studio Magazine no. 191, p. 32
 Revista Première no. 317, p. 39

External links
 
  
  
 Nha Fala at C.E,M. (interview with Flora Gomes)
 Nha Fala – shown in Bissau (6 March 2004 – Bissau Media and Publications Agensy (Agência Bissau Media e Publicações))
 Nha Fala on DVD

2002 films
Cape Verdean drama films
Portuguese comedy-drama films
French musical comedy-drama films
Luxembourgian comedy-drama films
2002 comedy-drama films
Culture of São Vicente, Cape Verde
Mindelo
Films set in Paris
Films shot in Cape Verde
Films shot in Paris
2000s French films